Naviaux is a surname of French origin. People with that surname include:

 Larry Naviaux (born 1937), American football player and coach
 Roger Naviaux (active from 1973), French(?) entomologist

See also 
 Naviauxella, a genus of beetles
 

French-language surnames